State Road 293 (NM 293) is a  state highway in the US state of New Mexico. NM 293's southern terminus is at NM 211 west of Gila, and the northern terminus is at the end of state maintenance north-northeast of Gila.

Major intersections

See also

References

293
Transportation in Grant County, New Mexico